GPS animal tracking is a process whereby biologists, scientific researchers or conservation agencies can remotely observe relatively fine-scale movement or migratory patterns in a free-ranging wild animal using the Global Positioning System (GPS) and optional environmental sensors or automated data-retrieval technologies such as Argos satellite uplink, mobile data telephony or GPRS and a range of analytical software tools.

A GPS tracking device will normally record and store location data at a pre-determined interval or on interrupt by an environmental sensor. These data may be stored pending recovery of the device or relayed to a central data store or internet-connected computer using an embedded cellular (GPRS), radio, or satellite modem. The animal's location can then be plotted against a map or chart in near real-time or, when analysing the track later, using a GIS package or custom software.

GPS tracking devices may also be attached to domestic animals, such as pets, pedigree livestock and working dogs.
Some owners use these collars for geofencing of their pets.

GPS wildlife tracking can place additional constraints on size and weight and may not allow for post-deployment recharging or replacement of batteries or correction of attachment.
As well as allowing in-depth study of animal behaviour and migration, the high-resolution tracks available from a GPS-enabled system can potentially allow for tighter control of animal-borne communicable diseases such as the H5N1 strain of avian influenza.

Attachment

Collar attachment

Collar attachment is the primary attachment technique where the subject has a suitable body type and behaviour. Tracking collars would normally be used on the animal's neck (assuming the head has a larger circumference than the neck) but also on a limb, perhaps around an ankle. Suitable animals for neck attachment would include primates, large cats, some bears etc. Limb attachment would work well in animals such as kiwi, where the foot is much larger than the ankle.

Harness attachment
Harness attachments may used in situations where collar attachment is not suitable, such as animals whose neck diameter may exceed that of the head. Examples of this type of animal may include pigs, Tasmanian devils, etc. 
Large, long-necked, birds such as the greylag goose may also need to be fitted with a harness to prevent removal of the tag by the subject.

Direct attachment
Direct attachment is used on animals where a collar cannot be used, such as birds, reptiles and marine mammals.

In the case of birds, the GPS unit must be very lightweight to avoid interfering with the bird's ability to fly or swim. The device is usually attached by gluing or, for short deployments, taping to the bird. The unit will then naturally fall off when the bird next moults.

In the case of reptiles such as crocodiles and turtles, gluing the unit onto the animal's skin or carapace using epoxy (or similar material) is the most common method and minimises discomfort.

In deployments on marine mammals such as phocids or otariids, the device would be glued to the fur and fall off during the annual moult. Units used with turtles or marine animals have to resist the corrosive effects of sea water and be waterproof to pressures of up to 200bar.

Other attachment methods
Other applications include rhinoceros tracking, for which a hole may be drilled in the animal's horn and a device implanted. Compared to other methods, implanted transmitters may suffer from a reduced range as the large mass of the animal's body can absorb some transmitted power.

There are also GPS implants for large snakes, such as ones offered by Telemetry Solutions.

Software

Embedded
Duty Cycle Scheduling - GPS devices typically record data about the animal's exact location and store readings at pre-set intervals known as duty-cycles.
By setting the interval between readings, the researcher is able to determine the lifespan of the device - very frequent readings drain battery power more rapidly, whereas longer intervals between readings might provide lower resolution but over a longer deployment.

Release Timers - Some devices can be programmed to drop off at a set time/date rather than requiring recapture and manually retrieval. Some may also be fitted with a low-power radio receiver allowing a remote signal to trigger the automatic release.

Analytical
Locational data provided by GPS devices can be displayed using Geographic information system (GIS) packages such as the open-source GRASS or plotted and prepared for display on the World Wide Web using packages such as Generic Mapping Tools (GMT), FollowDem (developed by Ecrins national Park to track ibex) or Maptool.

Statistical software such as R can be used to display and examine data and may reveal behavioural patterns or trends.

Data retrieval

Argos

GPS tracking devices have been linked to an Argos Platform Transmitter Terminal (PTT) enabling them to transmit data via the Argos System, a scientific satellite system which has been in use since 1978. Users can download their data directly from Argos via telnet and process the raw data to extract their transmitted information.

Where satellite uplink fails due to antenna damage, it may be possible to intercept the underpowered transmission locally using a satellite uplink receiver.

GSM
GPS location data can be transmitted via the GSM mobile/cell phone network, using SMS messages or internet protocols over a GPRS session. The EPASTO  GPS is dedicated to follow and locate cow.

UHF/VHF
GPS data may be transmitted via short-range radio signals and decoded using a custom receiver.

Complications

Effects on animals 
It was believed that GPS collars used on animals affected their behavior. This theory was tested on elephants that lived in a zoo in the United States. They studied how the elephants behaved with and without the collars for the same amount of time for both scenarios and saw no change in behavior. A study was done with mantled howler monkeys to see if GPS Ball and Chain collars had any effect on the monkeys behavior. The study involved observing a group of collared and uncollared female howler monkeys. There was no major difference in the collared and uncollared behavior but when the study was over it was discovered that the monkeys had injuries. The collars had caused damage to the necks of the monkeys; one had small scratches and some swelling while four other monkeys had deep cuts from the collar. Two of the monkeys with the lacerations had their tissue healing over the collar.

Tracking technology and battery life 
There is a need for Internet-enabled tracking collars for animals to be designed with a multiple year lifespan to avoid interference with the animals. Satellite tracking devices are deployed in ultra remote areas. In-order to preserve battery power the device only powers on when it is required.
GSM or cellular technology is widely deployed where connectivity is available - however GSM is also highly intensive on battery power. Devices either have a large battery or are only powered on when required.
Sigfox or LoRa are new technologies powering the Internet of Things connectivity. These technologies are beginning to be deployed in remote areas due to their ease of deployment and incredibly long range. The advantages of these technologies for an animal tracking collar is that the device form size can be minimised and the battery life extended greatly. Sigfox has already covered large parts of the Kruger National Park in South Africa allowing rangers to better track smaller forms of wildlife.

See also
 Automatic Packet Reporting System
 Electronic tagging
 Surveillance
 Telematics
 Telemetry

References

Global Positioning System
Wildlife conservation
Telemetry
Geopositioning